This is a list of Estonian television related events from 2009.

Events
7 March - Urban Symphony are selected to represent Estonia at the 2009 Eurovision Song Contest with their song "Rändajad". They are selected to be the fifteenth Estonian Eurovision entry during Eesti Laul held at the ETV Studios in Tallinn.
20 December - Ott Lepland wins the third season of Eesti otsib superstaari, becoming the show's first man to be crowned as winner.

Debuts

Television shows

1990s
Õnne 13 (1993–present)

2000s
Eesti otsib superstaari (2007–present)

Ending this year

Births

Deaths